Graham John Dockray FMedSci, FRS (born 1946) is a British physiologist, and Professor of Physiology at University of Liverpool.

Life
He earned a B.Sc. and Ph.D. in Zoology, from University of Nottingham in 1971.

References

External links
http://www.gastrohep.com/profiles/default.asp?person=gdockray
http://www.ae-info.org/ae/User/Dockray_Graham

1946 births
British physiologists
Fellows of the Royal Society
Fellows of the Academy of Medical Sciences (United Kingdom)
Academics of the University of Liverpool
Alumni of the University of Nottingham
Graham
Living people